

Events

Pre-1600
1257 – Kraków, in Poland, receives city rights.
1283 – Battle of the Gulf of Naples: Roger of Lauria, admiral to King Peter III of Aragon, destroys the Neapolitan fleet and captures Charles of Salerno.
1288 – The Battle of Worringen ends the War of the Limburg Succession, with John I, Duke of Brabant, being one of the more important victors.

1601–1900
1610 – The masque Tethys' Festival is performed at Whitehall Palace to celebrate the investiture of Henry Frederick, Prince of Wales.
1644 – The Qing dynasty Manchu forces led by the Shunzhi Emperor take Beijing during the collapse of the Ming dynasty.
1798 – The Battle of New Ross: The attempt to spread the United Irish Rebellion into Munster is defeated.
1817 – The first Great Lakes steamer, the Frontenac, is launched.
1829 –  captures the armed slave ship Voladora off the coast of Cuba.
1832 – The June Rebellion breaks out in Paris in an attempt to overthrow the monarchy of Louis Philippe.
1837 – Houston is incorporated by the Republic of Texas.
1849 – Denmark becomes a constitutional monarchy by the signing of a new constitution.
1851 – Harriet Beecher Stowe's anti-slavery serial, Uncle Tom's Cabin, or Life Among the Lowly, starts a ten-month run in the National Era abolitionist newspaper.
1862 – As the Treaty of Saigon is signed, ceding parts of southern Vietnam to France, the guerrilla leader Trương Định decides to defy Emperor Tự Đức of Vietnam and fight on against the Europeans.
1864 – American Civil War: Battle of Piedmont: Union forces under General David Hunter defeat a Confederate army at Piedmont, Virginia, taking nearly 1,000 prisoners.
1873 – Sultan Barghash bin Said of Zanzibar closes the great slave market under the terms of a treaty with Great Britain. 
1883 – The first regularly scheduled Orient Express departs Paris.
1888 – The Rio de la Plata earthquake takes place.
1893 – The trial of Lizzie Borden for the murder of her father and step-mother begins in New Bedford, Massachusetts.
1900 – Second Boer War: British soldiers take Pretoria.

1901–present
1915 – Denmark amends its constitution to allow women's suffrage.
1916 – Louis Brandeis is sworn in as a Justice of the United States Supreme Court; he is the first American Jew to hold such a position.
  1916   – World War I: The Arab Revolt against the Ottoman Empire breaks out.
1917 – World War I: Conscription begins in the United States as "Army registration day".
1940 – World War II: After a brief lull in the Battle of France, the Germans renew the offensive against the remaining French divisions south of the River Somme in Operation Fall Rot ("Case Red").
1941 – World War II: Four thousand Chongqing residents are asphyxiated in a bomb shelter during the Bombing of Chongqing.
1942 – World War II: The United States declares war on Bulgaria, Hungary, and Romania.
1944 – World War II: More than 1,000 British bombers drop 5,000 tons of bombs on German gun batteries on the Normandy coast in preparation for D-Day.
1945 – The Allied Control Council, the military occupation governing body of Germany, formally takes power.
1946 – A fire in the La Salle Hotel in Chicago, Illinois, kills 61 people.
1947 – Cold War: Marshall Plan: In a speech at Harvard University, the United States Secretary of State George Marshall calls for economic aid to war-torn Europe.
1949 – Thailand elects Orapin Chaiyakan, the first female member of Thailand's Parliament.
1956 – Elvis Presley introduces his new single, "Hound Dog", on The Milton Berle Show, scandalizing the audience with his suggestive hip movements.
1959 – The first government of Singapore is sworn in.
1960 – The Lake Bodom murders occur in Finland.
1963 – The British Secretary of State for War, John Profumo, resigns in a sex scandal known as the "Profumo affair".
  1963   – Movement of 15 Khordad: Protests against the arrest of Ayatollah Ruhollah Khomeini by the Shah of Iran, Mohammad Reza Pahlavi. In several cities, masses of angry demonstrators are confronted by tanks and paratroopers.
1964 – DSV Alvin is commissioned.
1967 – The Six-Day War begins: Israel launches surprise strikes against Egyptian air-fields in response to the mobilisation of Egyptian forces on the Israeli border.
1968 – Presidential candidate Robert F. Kennedy is assassinated by Sirhan Sirhan.
1975 – The Suez Canal opens for the first time since the Six-Day War.
  1975   – The United Kingdom holds its first country-wide referendum on membership of the European Economic Community (EEC).
1976 – The Teton Dam in Idaho, United States, collapses. Eleven people are killed as a result of flooding.
1981 – The Morbidity and Mortality Weekly Report of the Centers for Disease Control and Prevention reports that five people in Los Angeles, California, have a rare form of pneumonia seen only in patients with weakened immune systems, in what turns out to be the first recognized cases of AIDS.
1983 – More than 100 people are killed when the Russian river cruise ship Aleksandr Suvorov collides with a girder of the Ulyanovsk Railway Bridge. The collision caused a freight train to derail, further damaging the vessel, yet the ship remained afloat and was eventually restored and returned to service.
1984 – Operation Blue Star: Under orders from India's prime minister, Indira Gandhi, the Indian Army begins an invasion of the Golden Temple, the holiest site of the Sikh religion.
1989 – The Tank Man halts the progress of a column of advancing tanks for over half an hour after the Tiananmen Square protests of 1989.
1993 – Portions of the Holbeck Hall Hotel in Scarborough, North Yorkshire, UK, fall into the sea following a landslide.
1995 – The Bose–Einstein condensate is first created.
1997 – The Second Republic of the Congo Civil War begins.
1998 – A strike begins at the General Motors parts factory in Flint, Michigan, that quickly spreads to five other assembly plants. The strike lasts seven weeks.
2000 – The Six-Day War in Kisangani begins in Kisangani, in the Democratic Republic of the Congo, between Ugandan and Rwandan forces. A large part of the city is destroyed.
2001 – Tropical Storm Allison makes landfall on the upper-Texas coastline as a strong tropical storm and dumps large amounts of rain over Houston. The storm causes $5.5 billion in damages, making Allison the second costliest tropical storm in U.S. history.
2003 – A severe heat wave across Pakistan and India reaches its peak, as temperatures exceed 50 °C (122 °F) in the region.
2004 – Noël Mamère, Mayor of Bègles, celebrates marriage for two men for the first time in France.
2006 – Serbia declares independence from the State Union of Serbia and Montenegro.
2009 – After 65 straight days of civil disobedience, at least 31 people are killed in clashes between security forces and indigenous people near Bagua, Peru.
2015 – An earthquake with a moment magnitude of 6.0 strikes Ranau, Sabah, Malaysia, killing 18 people, including hikers and mountain guides on Mount Kinabalu, after mass landslides that occurred during the earthquake. This is the strongest earthquake to strike Malaysia since 1975.
2017 – Montenegro becomes the 29th member of NATO.
  2017   – Six Arab countries—Bahrain, Egypt, Libya, Saudi Arabia, Yemen, and the United Arab Emirates—cut diplomatic ties with Qatar, accusing it of destabilising the region.

Births

Pre-1600

1341 – Edmund of Langley, 1st Duke of York, son of King Edward III of England and Lord Warden of the Cinque Ports (d. 1402)
1412 – Ludovico III Gonzaga, Marquis of Mantua, Italian ruler (d. 1478)
1493 – Justus Jonas, German priest and academic (d. 1555)
1523 – Margaret of France, Duchess of Berry (d. 1573)
1554 – Benedetto Giustiniani, Italian clergyman (d. 1621)
1587 – Robert Rich, 2nd Earl of Warwick, English colonial administrator and admiral (d. 1658)
1596 – Peter Wtewael, Dutch Golden Age painter (d. 1660)

1601–1900
1640 – Pu Songling, Chinese author (d. 1715)
1646 – Elena Cornaro Piscopia, Italian mathematician and philosopher (d. 1684)
1660 – Sarah Churchill, Duchess of Marlborough (d. 1744)
1757 – Pierre Jean George Cabanis, French physiologist and philosopher (d. 1808)
1760 – Johan Gadolin, Finnish chemist, physicist, and mineralogist (d. 1852)
1771 – Ernest Augustus, King of Hanover (d. 1851)
1781 – Christian Lobeck, German scholar and academic (d. 1860)
1801 – William Scamp, English architect and engineer (d. 1872)
1819 – John Couch Adams, English mathematician and astronomer (d. 1892)
1830 – Carmine Crocco, Italian soldier (d. 1905)
1850 – Pat Garrett, American sheriff (d. 1908)
1862 – Allvar Gullstrand, Swedish ophthalmologist and optician, Nobel Prize laureate (d. 1930)
1868 – James Connolly, Scottish-born Irish rebel leader (d. 1916)
1870 – Bernard de Pourtalès, Swiss captain and sailor (d. 1935)
1876 – Isaac Heinemann, German-Israeli scholar and academic (d. 1957)
1877 – Willard Miller, Canadian-American sailor, Medal of Honor recipient (d. 1959)
1878 – Pancho Villa, Mexican general and politician, Governor of Chihuahua (d. 1923)
1879 – Robert Mayer, German-English businessman and philanthropist (d. 1985)
1883 – John Maynard Keynes, English economist, philosopher, and academic (d. 1946)
  1883   – Mary Helen Young, Scottish nurse and resistance fighter during World War II (d. 1945)
1884 – Ralph Benatzky, Czech-Swiss composer (d. 1957)
  1884   – Ivy Compton-Burnett, English author (d. 1969)
  1884   – Frederick Lorz, American runner (d. 1914)
1892 – Jaan Kikkas, Estonian weightlifter (d. 1944)
1894 – Roy Thomson, 1st Baron Thomson of Fleet, Canadian-English publisher and academic (d. 1976)
1895 – William Boyd, American actor and producer (d. 1972)
  1895   – William Roberts, English soldier and painter (d. 1980)
1898 – Salvatore Ferragamo, Italian shoe designer, founded Salvatore Ferragamo S.p.A. (d. 1960)
  1898   – Federico García Lorca, Spanish poet, playwright, and director (d. 1936)
1899 – Otis Barton, American diver, engineer, and actor, designed the bathysphere (d. 1992)
  1899   – Theippan Maung Wa, Burmese writer (d. 1942)
1900 – Dennis Gabor, Hungarian-English physicist and engineer, Nobel Prize laureate (d. 1979)

1901–present
1912 – Dean Amadon, American ornithologist and author (d. 2003)
  1912   – Eric Hollies, English cricketer (d. 1981)
1913 – Conrad Marca-Relli, American-Italian painter and academic (d. 2000)
1914 – Beatrice de Cardi, English archaeologist and academic (d. 2016)
1915 – Lancelot Ware,  English barrister and biochemist, co-founder of Mensa (d. 2000)
1916 – Sid Barnes, Australian cricketer (d. 1973)
  1916   – Eddie Joost, American baseball player and manager (d. 2011)
1919 – Richard Scarry, American-Swiss author and illustrator (d. 1994)
1920 – Marion Motley, American football player and coach (d. 1999)
  1920   – Cornelius Ryan, Irish-American journalist and author (d. 1974)
1922 – Paul Couvret, Dutch-Australian soldier, pilot, and politician (d. 2013)
  1922   – Sheila Sim, English actress (d. 2016)
1923 – Jorge Daponte, Argentinian racing driver (d. 1963)
  1923   – Daniel Pinkham, American organist and composer (d. 2006)
1924 – Art Donovan, American football player and radio host (d. 2013)
1926 – Paul Soros, Hungarian-American engineer and businessman (d. 2013)
1928 – Robert Lansing, American actor (d. 1994)
  1928   – Tony Richardson, English-American director and producer (d. 1991)
1930 – Alifa Rifaat, Egyptian author (d. 1996)
1931 – Yves Blais, Canadian businessman and politician (d. 1998)
  1931   – Jacques Demy, French actor, director, and screenwriter (d. 1990)
  1931   – Jerzy Prokopiuk, Polish anthropologist and philosopher (d. 2021)
1932 – Christy Brown, Irish painter and author (d. 1981)
  1932   – Dave Gold, American businessman, founded the 99 Cents Only Stores (d. 2013)
1933 – Bata Živojinović, Serbian actor and politician (d. 2016)
1934 – Vilhjálmur Einarsson, Icelandic triple jumper, painter, and educator (d. 2019)
  1934   – Bill Moyers, American journalist, 13th White House Press Secretary
1937 – Hélène Cixous, French author, poet, and critic
1938 – Moira Anderson, Scottish singer
  1938   – Karin Balzer, German hurdler (d. 2019)
  1938   – Roy Higgins, Australian jockey (d. 2014)
1939 – Joe Clark, Canadian journalist and politician, 16th Prime Minister of Canada
  1939   – Margaret Drabble, English novelist, biographer, and critic
1941 – Martha Argerich, Argentinian pianist
  1941   – Erasmo Carlos, Brazilian singer-songwriter
  1941   – Spalding Gray, American writer, actor, and monologist (d. 2004)
  1941   – Gudrun Sjödén, Swedish designer
1942 – Teodoro Obiang Nguema Mbasogo, Equatoguinean lieutenant and politician, 2nd President of Equatorial Guinea
1943 – Abraham Viruthakulangara, Roman Catholic Archbishop of Nagpur, Maharashtra, India (d. 2018)
1944 – Whitfield Diffie, American cryptographer and academic
1945 – John Carlos, American runner and football player
  1945   – André Lacroix, Canadian-American ice hockey player and coach
1946 – John Du Cann, English guitarist (d. 2001)
  1946   – Bob Grant, Australian rugby league player
  1946   – Patrick Head, English engineer and businessman, co-founded Williams F1
  1946   – Wanderléa, Brazilian singer and television host
1947 – Laurie Anderson, American singer-songwriter and violinist
  1947   – Tom Evans, English singer-songwriter and guitarist (d. 1983)
  1947   – David Hare, English director, playwright, and screenwriter
  1947   – Freddie Stone, American singer, guitarist, and pastor 
1949 – Ken Follett, Welsh author
  1949   – Elizabeth Gloster, English lawyer and judge
  1949   – Alexander Scrymgeour, 12th Earl of Dundee, Scottish politician
1950 – Ronnie Dyson, American singer and actor (d. 1990)
  1950   – Abraham Sarmiento, Jr., Filipino journalist and activist (d. 1977)
1951 – Suze Orman, American financial adviser, author, and television host
1952 – Pierre Bruneau, Canadian journalist and news anchor
  1952   – Carole Fredericks, American singer  (d. 2001)
  1952   – Nicko McBrain, English drummer and songwriter
1953 – Kathleen Kennedy, American film producer, co-founded Amblin Entertainment
1954 – Alberto Malesani, Italian footballer and manager
  1954   – Phil Neale, English cricketer, coach, and manager
  1954   – Nancy Stafford, American model and actress
1955 – Edino Nazareth Filho, Brazilian footballer and manager
1956 – Kenny G, American saxophonist, songwriter, and producer
1958 – Avigdor Lieberman, Moldavian-Israeli soldier and politician, Deputy Prime Minister of Israel
  1958   – Ahmed Abdallah Mohamed Sambi, Comorian businessman and politician, President of Comoros
1959 – Mark Ella, Australian rugby player
  1959   – Werner Schildhauer, German runner
  1960   – Claire Fox, English author and academic
1961 – Anke Behmer, German heptathlete
  1961   – Mary Kay Bergman, American voice actress (d. 1999)
  1961   – Anthony Burger, American singer and pianist (d. 2006)
  1961   – Aldo Costa, Italian engineer
  1961   – Ramesh Krishnan, Indian tennis player and coach
1962 – Jeff Garlin, American actor, comedian, director, and screenwriter
  1962   – Tõnis Lukas, Estonian historian and politician, 34th Estonian Minister of Education
1964 – Lisa Cholodenko, American director and screenwriter
1965 – Michael E. Brown, American astronomer and author
  1965   – Sandrine Piau, French soprano
  1965   – Alfie Turcotte, American ice hockey player
1967 – Joe DeLoach, American sprinter
1968 – Ed Vaizey, English lawyer and politician, Minister for Culture, Communications and Creative Industries
1969 – Brian McKnight, American singer-songwriter, producer, and actor
1970 – Martin Gélinas, Canadian ice hockey player and coach
1971 – Susan Lynch, Northern Irish actress
  1971   – Alex Mooney, American politician
  1971   – Mark Wahlberg, American model, actor, producer, and rapper 
1972 – Yogi Adityanath, Indian priest and politician
  1972   – Paweł Kotla, Polish conductor and academic
1973 – Lamon Brewster, American boxer
  1973   – Gella Vandecaveye, Belgian martial artist
1974 – Mervyn Dillon, Trinidadian cricketer
  1974   – Scott Draper, Australian tennis player and golfer
  1974   – Russ Ortiz, American baseball player
1975 – Zydrunas Ilgauskas, Lithuanian-American basketball player
  1975   – Duncan Patterson, English drummer and keyboard player 
  1975   – Sandra Stals, Belgian runner
1976 – Giannis Giannoulis, Canadian basketball player
1977 – Liza Weil, American actress
1978 – Fernando Meira, Portuguese footballer
1979 – Stefanos Kotsolis, Greek footballer
  1979   – Matthew Scarlett, Australian footballer
  1979   – Pete Wentz, American singer-songwriter, bass player, actor, and fashion designer 
  1979   – Jason White, American race car driver
1980 – Mike Fisher, Canadian ice hockey player
  1980   – Antonio García, Spanish racing driver
1981 – Serhat Akın, Turkish footballer
  1981   – Sébastien Lefebvre, Canadian singer and guitarist 
1982 – Ryan Dallas Cook, American trombonist (d. 2005)
1983 – Marques Colston, American football player
1984 – Robert Barbieri, Canadian-Italian rugby player
1985 – Jeremy Abbott, American figure skater
  1985   – Ekaterina Bychkova, Russian tennis player
1986 – Dave Bolland, Canadian ice hockey player
  1986   – Vernon Gholston, American football player
1987 – Marcus Thornton, American basketball player
1988 – Alessandro Salvi, Italian footballer
1989 – Cam Atkinson, American ice hockey player
  1989   – Megumi Nakajima, Japanese voice actress and singer
1990 – Radko Gudas, Czech ice hockey defenceman
1991 – Sören Bertram, German footballer
1992 – Joazhiño Arroe, Peruvian footballer
  1992   – Emily Seebohm, Australian swimmer
1993 – Roger Tuivasa-Sheck, Samoan-New Zealand rugby league player 
1995 – Troye Sivan, South African–born Australian singer-songwriter, actor, and YouTuber
  1995   – Ross Wilson, English table tennis player
1997 – Sam Darnold, American football player
1998 – Jaqueline Cristian, Romanian tennis player
  1998   – Yulia Lipnitskaya, Russian figure skater 
  1999 – Suzan Lamens, Dutch tennis player

Deaths

Pre-1600
 301 – Sima Lun, Chinese emperor (b. 249)
 535 – Epiphanius, patriarch of Constantinople
 567 – Theodosius I, patriarch of Alexandria
 708 – Jacob of Edessa, Syrian bishop (b. 640)
 754 – Eoban, bishop of Utrecht
   754   – Boniface, English missionary and martyr (b. 675)
 879 – Ya'qub ibn al-Layth, Persian emir (b. 840)
 928 – Louis the Blind, king of Provence
1017 – Sanjō, emperor of Japan (b. 976)
1118 – Robert de Beaumont, 1st Earl of Leicester, Norman nobleman and politician (b. 1049)
1296 – Edmund Crouchback, English politician, Lord Warden of the Cinque Ports (b. 1245)
1310 – Amalric, prince of Tyre
1316 – Louis X, king of France (b. 1289)
1383 – Dmitry of Suzdal, Russian grand prince (b. 1324)
1400 – Frederick I, duke of Brunswick-Lüneburg
1424 – Braccio da Montone, Italian nobleman (b. 1368)
1434 – Yuri IV, Russian grand prince (b. 1374)
1443 – Ferdinand, Portuguese prince (b. 1402)
1445 – Leonel Power, English composer
1530 – Mercurino Gattinara, Italian statesman and jurist (b. 1465)
1568 – Lamoral, Count of Egmont (b. 1522)

1601–1900
1625 – Orlando Gibbons, English organist and composer (b. 1583)
1667 – Francesco Sforza Pallavicino, Italian cardinal and historian (b. 1607)
1708 – Ignatius George II, Syriac Orthodox Patriarch of Antioch (b. 1648)
1716 – Roger Cotes, English mathematician and academic (b. 1682)
1722 – Johann Kuhnau, German organist and composer (b. 1660)
1738 – Isaac de Beausobre, French pastor and theologian (b. 1659)
1740 – Henry Grey, 1st Duke of Kent, English politician and courtier (b. 1671)
1791 – Frederick Haldimand, Swiss-Canadian general and politician, 22nd Governor of Quebec (b. 1718)
1816 – Giovanni Paisiello, Italian composer and educator (b. 1741)
1825 – Odysseas Androutsos, Greek soldier (b. 1788)
1826 – Carl Maria von Weber, German pianist, composer, and conductor (b. 1786)
1866 – John McDouall Stuart, Scottish explorer and surveyor (b. 1815)
1899 – Antonio Luna, Filipino general (b. 1866)
1900 – Stephen Crane, American poet, novelist, and short story writer (b. 1871)

1901–present
1906 – Karl Robert Eduard von Hartmann, German philosopher and author (b. 1842)
1910 – O. Henry, American short story writer (b. 1862)
1913 – Chris von der Ahe, German-American businessman (b. 1851)
1916 – Herbert Kitchener, 1st Earl Kitchener, Irish-born British field marshal and politician, Secretary of State for War (b. 1850)
1920 – Rhoda Broughton, Welsh-English author (b. 1840)
1921 – Will Crooks, English trade unionist and politician (b. 1852)
  1921   – Georges Feydeau, French playwright (b. 1862)
1930 – Eric Lemming, Swedish athlete (b. 1880)
  1930   – Pascin, Bulgarian-French painter and illustrator (b. 1885)
1934 – Emily Dobson, Australian philanthropist (b. 1842)
  1934   – William Holman, English-Australian politician, 19th Premier of New South Wales (b. 1871)
1947 – Nils Olaf Chrisander, Swedish-American actor and director (b. 1884)
1965 – Eleanor Farjeon, English author, poet, and playwright (b. 1881)
1967 – Arthur Biram, Israeli philologist, philosopher, and academic (b. 1878)
  1967   – Harry Brown, Australian public servant (b. 1878)
1993 – Conway Twitty, American singer-songwriter and guitarist (b. 1933)
1996 – Acharya Kuber Nath Rai, Indian poet and scholar (b. 1933)
1997 – J. Anthony Lukas, American journalist and author (b. 1933)
1998 – Jeanette Nolan, American actress (b. 1911)
  1998   – Sam Yorty, American soldier and politician, 37th Mayor of Los Angeles (b. 1909)
1999 – Mel Tormé, American singer-songwriter (b. 1925)
2000 – Don Liddle, American baseball player (b. 1925)
2002 – Dee Dee Ramone, American singer-songwriter and bass player (b. 1951)
2003 – Jürgen Möllemann, German soldier and politician, 10th Vice-Chancellor of Germany (b. 1945)
  2003   – Manuel Rosenthal, French composer and conductor (b. 1904)
2004 – Iona Brown, English violinist and conductor (b. 1941)
  2004   – Ronald Reagan, American actor and politician, 40th President of the United States (b. 1911)
2005 – Adolfo Aguilar Zínser, Mexican scholar and politician (b. 1949)
  2005   – Wee Chong Jin, Singaporean judge (b. 1917)
2006 – Frederick Franck, Dutch-American painter, sculptor, and author (b. 1909)
  2006   – Edward L. Moyers, American businessman (b. 1928)
2009 – Jeff Hanson, American singer-songwriter and guitarist (b. 1978)
2011 – Azam Khan, Bangladeshi singer-songwriter (b. 1950)
2012 – Ray Bradbury, American science fiction writer and screenwriter  (b. 1920)
  2012   – Hal Keller, American baseball player and manager (b. 1928)
  2012   – Mihai Pătrașcu, Romanian-American computer scientist (b. 1982)
  2012   – Charlie Sutton, Australian footballer and coach (b. 1924)
2013 – Helen McElhone, Scottish politician (b. 1933)
  2013   – Stanisław Nagy, Polish cardinal (b. 1921)
  2013   – Ruairí Ó Brádaigh, Irish republican activist and politician (b. 1932)
  2013   – Michel Ostyn, Belgian physiologist and physician (b. 1924)
2014 – Abu Abdulrahman al-Bilawi, Iraqi commander (b. 1971)
  2014   – Don Davis, American songwriter and producer (b. 1938)
  2014   – Reiulf Steen, Norwegian journalist and politician, Norwegian Minister of Transport and Communications (b. 1933)
2015 – Tariq Aziz, Iraqi journalist and politician, Iraqi Minister of Foreign Affairs (b. 1936)
  2015   – Alan Bond, English-Australian businessman (b. 1938)
  2015   – Richard Johnson, English actor (b. 1927)
  2015   – Roger Vergé, French chef and author (b. 1930)
2016 – Jerome Bruner, American psychologist (b. 1915)
2017 – Andy Cunningham, English actor (b. 1950)
  2017   – Cheick Tioté, Ivorian footballer (b. 1986)
2018 – Kate Spade, American fashion designer (b. 1962)

Holidays and observances
Arbor Day (New Zealand)
Christian feast day:
Boniface (Roman Catholic Church)
Dorotheus of Tyre
Genesius, Count of Clermont
Blessed Meinwerk
June 5 (Eastern Orthodox liturgics)
Constitution Day (Denmark)
Father's Day (Denmark)
Indian Arrival Day (Suriname)
Liberation Day (Seychelles)
President's Day (Equatorial Guinea)
Reclamation Day (Azerbaijan)
World Day Against Speciesism (International)
World Environment Day (International)

References

External links

 
 
 

Days of the year
June